Teucrium puberulum, commonly known as red berry stick plant, is a species of flowering plant in the family Lamiaceae, and is endemic to inland areas of eastern Australia. It is an erect shrub covered with star-shaped hairs, and with linear to lance-shaped leaves, greenish-white flowers and reddish fruit.

Description
Flowering occurs in spring and summer and the fruit is a reddish drupe,  in diameter.

Taxonomy
This germander was first formally described in 1883 by Ferdinand von Mueller who gave it the name Spartothamnus junceus var. puberulus in the Southern Science Record. In 1889 he elevated it to a species, Spartothamnus puberulus. In 1916, Joseph Maiden & Ernst Betche assigned it to the genus, Spartothamnella, and the plant became Spartothamnella puberula. In 2016, Stefan Kattari and Christian Bräuchler changed the name to Teucrium puberulum in the journal Taxon.

Distribution and habitat
Teucrium puberulum grows in mallee and grassy woodland in inland areas between Charters Towers in Queensland and Condobolin in New South Wales.

References

External links
Teucrium puberulum occurrence data from Australasian Virtual Herbarium

puberulum
Lamiales of Australia
Flora of New South Wales
Flora of Queensland
Plants described in 1882
Taxa named by Ferdinand von Mueller